The 1986–87 National Hurling League (known as the Ford National Hurling League for sponsorship reasons) was the 56th season of the National Hurling League.

Division 1

Kilkenny came into the season as defending champions of the 1985-86 season. Westmeath and Wexford entered Division 1 as the promoted teams.

On 3 May 1987, Galway won the title following a 3-12 to 3-10 win over Clare in the final. It was their first league title since 1974-75 and their 3rd National League title overall.

Offaly and Westmeath were relegated from Division 1.

Clare's Cyril Lyons was the Division 1 top scorer with 4-51.

Table

Group stage

Knock-out stage

Quarter-finals

Semi-finals

Final

Scoring statistics

Top scorer overall

Top scorers in a single game

Division 2

Dublin, Laois, Mayo and Waterford entered Division 2 as the promoted and relegated teams from the previous season.

On 1 March 1987, Tipperary secured the title following a 5-18 to 0-2 win over Mayo in the final round of the group stage. Waterford secured promotion to Division 1 as the second-placed team.

Mayo and Meath were relegated from Division 2.

Table

Division 3

Down, Monaghan and Roscommon entered Division 3 as the promoted and relegated teams from the previous season.

On 1 March 1987, Down secured the title following a 3-18 to 0-6 win over Kildare in the final round of the group stage. Roscommon secured promotion to Division 1 as the second-placed team.

Monaghan were relegated from Division 2.

Table

Division Four

Knock-out stage

External links

References

National Hurling League seasons
League
League